Edgar Greenard Poles (born August 16, 1943) is a retired Canadian football linebacker. Poles attended the University at Buffalo where he played college football for the Buffalo Bulls football team. Poles later played professional football in the Canadian Football League (CFL), playing for the Edmonton Eskimos from 1966 to 1968, and for the BC Lions from 1969 to 1970.

References

External links
Buffalo Bulls bio
Pro Football Archives profile
Just Sports Stats profile
Stats Crew profile

Living people
1943 births
American football linebackers
Canadian football linebackers
American players of Canadian football
Buffalo Bulls football players
BC Lions players
Edmonton Elks players